During the 2004–05 English football season, Sunderland A.F.C. competed in the Football League Championship.

Season Summary
While a poor start to the season saw Sunderland win just one of their first six matches, putting manager Mick McCarthy under pressure, the board kept faith with the manager, and were rewarded with a much more consistent season than the previous one. The team never dropped out of the top six after a victory over Millwall in mid-October, and their form steadily improved over the season. Along with a collapse by early-season pace-setters Ipswich Town, this lifted Sunderland to the top of the table with seven matches remaining, and they held onto top spot, returning to the Premier League after two seasons.

Transfers

In

Summer

January

Out

Summer

January

Players

First-team squad
Squad at end of season

Left club during season

Reserves
The following players did not appear for the first-team this season.

Results
Sunderland's score comes first.

League Cup

FA Cup

Championship

League table

Results summary

Results by matchday

Topscorers

1.  Marcus Stewart - 17
2.  Stephen Elliott - 16
3.  Julio Arca - 9
4.  Chris Brown - 7
5.  Liam Lawrence - 6
6.  Dean Whitehead - 5
7.  Carl Robinson,  Sean Thornton and  Steven Caldwell - 4
8.  Michael Bridges,  Andy Welsh and  Gary Breen - 2
9.  Kevin Kyle,  Darren Carter and  Stephen Wright - 1

References

Mart Poom calms fears of fans - http://news.bbc.co.uk/sport1/hi/football/teams/s/sunderland/3631300.stm

Notes

Sunderland A.F.C. seasons
Sunderland A.F.C.